Wild Horses is a 2015 American Western crime film written and directed by Robert Duvall. The film stars Robert Duvall, James Franco, Josh Hartnett, Adriana Barraza, Jim Parrack and Luciana Duvall. The film was released on June 5, 2015, by Entertainment One Films.

Plot
A Texas Ranger Samantha Payne opens up a fifteen-year-old missing persons case and begins to suspect that the missing boy was murdered - and that a local rancher was involved.

Cast
Robert Duvall as Scott Briggs
James Franco as Ben Briggs
Joaquin Jackson as Ranger Jackson 
Josh Hartnett as KC Briggs
Adriana Barraza as Mrs. Davis
Jim Parrack as Deputy Rogers
Luciana Duvall as Texas Ranger Samantha Payne
Angie Cepeda as Maria Gonzales

Release
The film premiered at South by Southwest on March 17, 2015. Shortly after the film's debut at the festival, the distribution rights were acquired by Entertainment One Films. The film was released in a limited release and through video on demand on June 5, 2015.

Reception
Wild Horses received negative reviews from critics. On Rotten Tomatoes, the film has a rating of 17%, based on 12 reviews, with a rating of 4.2/10. On Metacritic, the film has a score of 44 out of 100, based on 9 critics, indicating "mixed or average reviews".

References

External links
 

2015 films
2010s crime films
American crime films
Films directed by Robert Duvall
2010s English-language films
2010s American films